Buglere, also known as Bugle, Murire and Muoy, is a Chibchan language of Panama closely related to Guaymi. There are two dialects, Sabanero and Bokotá (Bogota), spoken by the Bokota people.

References

Chibchan languages